Easter Road Park Halt railway station was a railway station located in Lochend, Edinburgh, Scotland from 1950 to 1967 on the Leith Central Branch. It was built to serve the nearby Easter Road stadium.

History
This short-lived station was opened in 1950 by British Railways. It consisted of one wooden platform and was solely open on match days for arrivals only. Fans would have to make their return journey after the match from neighbouring stations in Leith, Abbeyhill or at Waverley.

References

External links

Disused railway stations in Edinburgh
Railway stations opened by British Rail
Railway stations in Great Britain opened in 1950
Railway stations in Great Britain closed in 1967
1950 establishments in Scotland
1967 disestablishments in Scotland